Miguel Raymondo Martinez (born 30 January 1988) is a Lebanese professional basketball player for Champville of the Lebanese Basketball League. He was a member of the Lebanese national team.

Professional career
Martinez started his pro career with Blue Stars in 2005, before moving to Champville in 2009 for a two-year stint. He then spent one season playing for Sagesse, and three seasons playing for Sporting Al Riyadi Beirut. For the 2015–16 season, he joined Louaize Club for 2 seasons . In 2017 he joined the newly promoted team Beirut Sporting Club. In September 2019, he inked with Sporting Al Riyadi Beirut.

National team career
Martinez was a member of the Lebanese youth national team that participated in the 2007 FIBA Under-19 World Championship In 2011, he played for the senior national team at the 2011 FIBA Asia Championship. He joined the national team another time in 2016 for the waba championship

References

1988 births
Living people
Lebanese men's basketball players
Point guards
Sagesse SC basketball players
Al Riyadi Club Beirut basketball players